William Lawrence Ludwig (May 27, 1882 – September 5, 1947) was a catcher in Major League Baseball. He played for the St. Louis Cardinals in 1908. He also played in the minor leagues for 11 seasons from 1903 through 1914.

References

External links

1882 births
1947 deaths
Major League Baseball catchers
St. Louis Cardinals players
Baseball players from Louisville, Kentucky
Toledo Swamp Angels players
Minneapolis Millers (baseball) players
Cedar Rapids Rabbits players
Springfield Senators players
Mobile Sea Gulls players
Memphis Turtles players
Milwaukee Brewers (minor league) players
Louisville Colonels (minor league) players
Columbus Senators players
Tacoma Tigers players
Champaign Velvets players
Nashville Vols players
Springfield Watchmakers players
Streator Boosters players
LaSalle Blue Sox players